Baddest or The Baddest may refer to:

Albums
Baddest (album), a 1981 album by Grover Washington Jr.
The Baddest (Toshinobu Kubota album), 1989
The Baddest II, a 1989  album by Toshinobu Kubota
The Baddest III, a 2002 album by Toshinobu Kubota
The Baddest: Only for Lovers in the Mood, a 2002 album by Toshinobu Kubota
The Baddest: Hit Parade, a 2011 album  by Toshinobu Kubota
The Baddest, album by Dave Graney & The Coral Snakes 1999

Songs
"Baddest", 2016 song by AKA (rapper)
"Baddest" (song), a 2021 song by Yung Bleu
"The Baddest" (Froggy Fresh song), 2012
"The Baddest" (K/DA song), 2020
"The Baddest" (BGYO song), 2021